The 1972 Macdonald Lassies Championship, the Canadian women's curling championship was held February 28 to March 2, 1972 at the Saskatoon Arena, in Saskatoon, Saskatchewan. It was the first year the event was sponsored by Macdonald Tobacco, which was also the main sponsor of the Brier at the time, Canada's men's curling championship. The attendance for the week was 15,714, a record at the time.

Team Saskatchewan, who was skipped by Vera Pezer won the Lassies by finishing the round robin with an 8–1 record. It was the fourth straight title for Saskatchewan, and second straight for the Pezer rink. Pezer became the first skip to win back-to-back championships and the third skip to win multiple championships, joining teammate Joyce McKee and British Columbia's Ina Hansen.

Teams
The teams were as follows:

Round Robin standings
Final round robin standings

Round Robin results
All draw times are listed in Central Standard Time (UTC-06:00).

Draw 1
Monday, February 22, 2:30 pm

Draw 2
Monday, February 22, 8:30 pm

Draw 3
Tuesday, February 23, 2:30 pm

Draw 4
Tuesday, February 23, 8:30 pm

Draw 5
Wednesday, February 23, 9:30 am

Draw 6
Wednesday, February 24, 2:30 pm

Draw 7
Wednesday, February 24, 8:30 pm

Draw 8
Thursday, February 25, 2:30 pm

Draw 9
Thursday, February 25, 8:30 pm

References

Scotties Tournament of Hearts
Macdonald Lassies
Curling in Saskatoon
1972 in Saskatchewan
February 1972 sports events in North America
March 1972 sports events in Canada